The Anti Mother (sometimes referred to as Norma Jean vs. The Anti Mother) is the fourth studio album from metalcore band Norma Jean. It is the first release to feature new drummer Chris Raines, making Chris Day and Scottie Henry the only members of the band to have appeared on all albums released by Norma Jean up to that point.

Album information
Norma Jean added several guest musicians to The Anti Mother, including Page Hamilton of Helmet, Chino Moreno of Deftones and Cove Reber of Saosin, they have also stated that, "We are not just doing "guest vocal" spots for them either... every band does that... we are going to write songs with them". The album was also produced by Ross Robinson, who had previously produced Norma Jean's 2006 album Redeemer.

Lead singer Cory Brandan commented on the new album and the meaning of the title:

A music video was made for the song "Robots: 3, Humans: 0" which has been featured on MTV2's Headbangers Ball. It features the group performing in a room of flying debris and follows the supernatural adventure of a young couple.

Track listing

Personnel 

Norma Jean
Cory Brandan – lead vocals, guitars
Scottie Henry – guitars
Jake Schultz – bass
Chris Day – guitars
Chris Raines – drums, percussion

Guest personnel
Chino Moreno – writing, guitars, vocals (track 4, 6, 7)
Page Hamilton – guitars, vocals (track 8)
Cove Reber – writing, vocals (tracks 4, 6, 7, 10)
Holly Rae – vocals (tracks 3, 10)
Camille Driscoll – vocals (tracks 3, 10)
Lainee Gram – vocals (track 10)
Ali Pantera Abrishami – vocals (track 10)

Production
Produced by Ross Robinson
Mixed by Ryan Boesch and Ross Robinson
Engineered by Ryan Boesch
Mastered by T-Roy

Art
Art Direction by Steve Hash and Norma Jean
Design by Steve Hash
Photography by Ralf Strathmann

References

External links
 Official website for the album "The Anti Mother"

Norma Jean (band) albums
2008 albums
Tooth & Nail Records albums
Albums produced by Ross Robinson
Post-hardcore albums by American artists
Solid State Records albums